Nodolatirus is a small genus of sea snails in the family Fasciolariidae, first named in 2013.

Species
There are four species within the genus Nodolatirus:
 Nodolatirus nodatus (Gmelin, 1791)
 Nodolatirus rapanus Bouchet & Snyder, 2013
 Nodolatirus recurvirostra (Schubert & J. A. Wagner, 1829)
 Nodolatirus robillardi (Tapparone Canefri, 1879)
Synonyms
 Nodolatirus recurvirostrus [sic]: synonym of Nodolatirus recurvirostra (Schubert & J. A. Wagner, 1829) (misspelling)

References

Fasciolariidae